Merab Merabovich Garnovsky (born 28 February 2001) is a Russian football player. He plays for FC Chayka Peschanokopskoye.

Club career
He made his debut in the Russian Football National League for FC Chayka Peschanokopskoye on 4 October 2020 in a game against FC SKA-Khabarovsk.

References

External links
 
 Profile by Russian Football National League

2001 births
Sportspeople from Rostov-on-Don
Living people
Russian footballers
Association football forwards
FC Chayka Peschanokopskoye players
Russian First League players